Douglas Patrick Adam (September 7, 1923 – December 24, 2001) was a Canadian professional ice hockey forward and coach. He spent most of his career, which lasted from 1942 to 1961, in the minor leagues, but did play four games in the National Hockey League for the New York Rangers during the 1949–50 season. He was born in Toronto, Ontario.

Career 
Adam was signed by the New York Rangers as a free agent in 1947, and played for various minor league affiliates of the Rangers until 1955.  In February 1950, Adam played four games at the NHL level with the Rangers in 1949–50, wearing number 19. During those four games, he scored no goals, but earned one assist.  After leaving the Rangers organization, Adam became a playing coach with the Philadelphia Ramblers in the EHL. After his playing career ended, Adam became a head coach with the Rochester Americans of the AHL in 1971-72, but was replaced mid-season by team member Don Cherry.

Career statistics

Regular season and playoffs

Coaching statistics

References

External links
 

1923 births
2001 deaths
Canadian expatriates in the United States
Canadian ice hockey coaches
Canadian ice hockey left wingers
Charlotte Clippers players
Hollywood Wolves players
Louisville Rebels players
New Westminster Royals (WHL) players
New York Rangers players
Ontario Hockey Association Senior A League (1890–1979) players
Philadelphia Ramblers players
Rochester Americans coaches
Saskatoon Quakers players
Seattle Bombers players
Ice hockey people from Toronto
Tacoma Rockets (WHL) players
Toronto Marlboros players
Vancouver Canucks (WHL) players